Hah Shamiz (also Romanized as Hah Shamīz; also known as Hashamīz, Hāshemīs, Hāshmīs, and Hashmīz) is a village in Zhavarud-e Sharqi Rural District, in the Central District of Sanandaj County, Kurdistan Province, Iran. At the 2006 census, its population was 1,522, in 362 families. The village is populated by Kurds.

References 

Towns and villages in Sanandaj County
Kurdish settlements in Kurdistan Province